Athgarh (ଆଠଗଡ) was one of the princely states of India during the period of the British Raj. The state was founded by Raja SriKaran Niladri Bebarta Patnaik in 1178 and had its capital in Athgarh (Athagad) town.
It was made part of Cuttack district after its merger into the state of Odisha in 1948. The emblem of the state was Radha Krishna.

History
The founder of the state was Raja SriKaran Niladri Bhagirath Barman. He was the minister of the Raja of Puri, who conferred on him the title of Raja and gave him Athgarh for his services, or according to another account, as a dowry on marrying the Raja's sister.
The Rajguru of Athgarh lived near Gada (Rani Mahal). Athgarh is alleged to have originally extended on the east as far as Parganas Cuttack haveli and Dalijora, on the west up to Tigria princely state, on the north from Kapilas to Gobindpur, Baldiaband, Nadiali, Krishnaprasad and Pachimeshwar temple and on the south to Banki, Dompara, Matri and Patia. Kakhari and Tapankhand were annexed by the Mughal Rulers. Parajan and Bajrakot were given as religious endowments. Raja of Dhenkanal who married the daughter of Raja of Athgarh obtained possession of most of the villages of Majkuri Bisa. During the British Raj, Athgarh was one of the Feudatory States of Orissa and acceded to India following the independence of India when the last ruler Raja SriKaran Radhanath Bebarta Patnaik signed the accession to the Indian Union on 1 January 1948.

Rulers
The rulers of Athagarh princely state:

Raja Srikaran Niladri Bhagirath Barman Patnaik (1178–1218 CE)
Raja Srikaran Dandapani Biwarta Patnaik (1218–1253)
Raja Srikaran Jagannath Biwarta Patnaik I (1253–1283)
...
Raja SriKaran Narayana Bebarta Patnaik (1681–1709)
Raja SriKaran Rama Krishna Bebarta Patnaik (1709–1741)
Raja SriKaran Debia Singh Bebarta Patnaik (1741–1771)
Raja SriKaran Gopinath Bebarta Patnaik (1771–1821)
Raja SriKaran Krishna Chandra Bebarta Patnaik (1821–1825)
Raja SriKaran Rama Chandra Bebarta Patnaik (1825–1837)
Raja SriKaran Bhubaneswar Bebarta Patnaik (1837–1862)
Raja SriKaran Jagannath Bebarta Patnaik II (1862–1869)
Raja SriKaran Bhagirathi Bebarta Patnaik (1869–1893)
Raja SriKaran Raghunath Bebarta Patnaik (1893–25 Jan 1896)
Raja SriKaran Vishwanath Bebarta Patnaik Bahadur (25 Jan 1896–22 Jun 1918)
Raja SriKaran Radhanath Bebarta Patnaik (22 Jun 1918–1 January 1948)

Titular
Raja SriKaran Radhanath Bebarta Patnaik (1 January 1948–23 Aug 1983)
Raja SriKaran Sankar Prasad Bebarta Patnaik (23 Aug 1983–30 Jan 1990)

Raja SriKaran Subhrapada Bebarta Patnaik (30 Jan 1990–present)

See also 
Eastern States Agency
Political integration of India

References

Princely states of Odisha
History of Odisha
Cuttack district
12th-century establishments in India
1178 establishments in Asia
1948 disestablishments in India